The White House is an historic building in the English market town of Poulton-le-Fylde, Lancashire. It has been designated a Grade II listed building by Historic England.

A town house, with the ground floor now occupied by businesses, it was built in the mid-18th century, constructed of rendered brick with a cornice gutter and a slate roof. It is on a double-pile plan with three storeys. It has five bays and the first-floor casement windows are tall with glazing bars; the second-floor windows are smaller. The front entrance to the building is flanked by Doric pilasters.

The White House was an early home of chaplain Harry Viener.

See also
Listed buildings in Poulton-le-Fylde

References

Sources 

 

Buildings and structures in Poulton-le-Fylde
18th-century establishments in England
Houses completed in the 18th century
Grade II listed buildings in Lancashire
Houses in Lancashire